Mohammadpur is a thana of Dhaka District in the division of Dhaka, Bangladesh. Although initially Mohammadpur had grown as a residential area, subsequent commercial places have also been developed as well.

History
Unlike some parts of Dhaka city, most parts of Mohammadpur were planned in the 1950s as relatively broad streets and avenues. Saat Masjid, a prominent archaeological structure in the area is part of a renowned mosque of Dhaka city called Shia Masjid.

Geography
It has an area of 11.65 km2.

Mohammadpur is connected to Sadar Ghat and Gabtali by the city protection dam. Mohammadpur borders Shyamoli and Adabor Thana to the north, Sher-E-Bangla Nagar to the east and Dhanmondi and Hazaribagh thanas to the south.

Demographics
According to the 2011 Bangladesh census, Mohammadpur Thana had 75,546 households and a population of 355,843, 100% of whom lived in urban areas. 7.3% of the population was under the age of 5. The literacy rate (age 7 and over) was 73.5%, compared to the national average of 51.8%.

Points of interest

Residential blocks
One of the largest apartment blocks in the capital, Japan Garden City is a part of the neighbourhood. Other well-known blocks include the Pisciculture Housing Society, Mohammadia Housing Society, Baitul Aman Housing Society, Chad Miah Housing, Probal Housing and a number of residential areas, which have all grown substantially. This has resulted in a real estate construction boom accompanied with markets and shopping complexes.

Kaderabad Housing is a large housing complex near Mohammadpur Bus Stand. The housing is well organized and has a college and school inside. A large apartment block developed by Assurance and Sara Builders sits near the complex. It is nearby the Main bus stand of Mohammadpur bus stand and Martyred Intellectuals Memorial.

Geneva camp
The Geneva Camp for "Stranded Pakistanis" (mostly from the Indian state of Bihar and other parts of India who migrated to the then East Pakistan during the Partition of 1947) is in Mohammadpur. Pakistanis have been living there since the end of the 1971 War of Liberation.

Asad Gate

Asad Gate is the monument of the country's liberation war. It was named after an unarmed young man named Asad was killed by the Pakistani army during protests against the erstwhile military junta of Pakistan, part of Bangladesh's independence movement.

Transportation
BRTC, Raja City, Moitri, Torongo, Torongo Plus, Malancha, projapoti, poristhan, rojonighondha,  swadhin, meshkat, 13 No,Dhaka nagar phoribahan. and some other bus transportation companies have facilitated the communication system of the inhabitants of this area.

Education

Schools and colleges or madrasha
 Child Heaven International School
 Ha-Mim Model School
 London Grace International School
 Gawsia islamia Fazil Degree Madrasha
 Quaderiya Tayebiya Aliya Kamil Madrasha
 Mohammadpur Government College
 Summerfield International School
 Govt. Graphic Arts Institute
 Mangrove School
 Mohammadpur Government High School
 Mohammadpur Girls' High School
 Mohammadpur Preparatory Higher Secondary School
 St Joseph Higher Secondary School
 St Francis Xavier's Green Herald International School
 Dhaka Residential Model College
 Northern International School
 Mohammadpur Central University College
 Dhaka State College
 Alhaj Mokbul Hossain Bisshobiddalay College
 Mohammadpur Model School & College
 Bengali Medium High School
 Dr. M Mizanur Rahman Professional College
 St Paul's Mission School Bangla Medium
 Dr. M Mizanur Rahman Collegiate School
 Firoza Bashar Ideal College
 St Paul's School English Medium

Universities
 University of Liberal Arts Bangladesh
 Bangladesh University
 People's University of Bangladesh

Culture
 Studio 6/6

See also
 Upazilas of Bangladesh
 Districts of Bangladesh
 Divisions of Bangladesh

References

Thanas of Dhaka